Sir Gurudas Banerjee Halt railway station is a Kolkata Suburban Railway station in Narkeldanga, Kolkata. It serves the local areas of Narkeldanga and Phoolbagan in Kolkata, West Bengal, India. A few trains run through this station and halt here. The station has two platforms. Its station code is SGBA.

Station complex
Earlier on the platform was not well sheltered. The station lacked many public facilities including water and sanitation.

However, in 2017, there have been many improvements to this station, wherein shelters and seats were added for passengers, water dispensers were placed, and floodlights have been positioned to ensure safety at night. The platform too, was considerably elongated to accommodate longer trains.

In the recent past, there has also been a surge in the number of passengers utilizing the station.

Connections

Auto 
Phoolbagan to Sealdah auto route connects the station to Sealdah railway station.

Bus 
Bus route number 12C/2, 44, 45, 217B, 221, 223, 235, 253, DN17, S122 (Mini), S138 (Mini), S165 (Mini), S173 (Mini), AC49A, D11A serve the station.

Metro 
Phoolbagan of Kolkata Metro Line 2 is within 500m.

Air

External links

References 

Sealdah railway division
Railway stations in Kolkata
Transport in Kolkata
Kolkata Suburban Railway stations
Kolkata Circular Railway